

Events

Pre-1600
660 BC – Traditional date for the foundation of Japan by Emperor Jimmu.
55 – The death under mysterious circumstances of Tiberius Claudius Caesar Britannicus, heir to the Roman Empire, on the eve of his coming of age clears the way for Nero to become Emperor.
 951 – Guo Wei, a court official, leads a military coup and declares himself emperor of the new Later Zhou.
1534 – Henry VIII of England is recognized as supreme head of the Church of England.
1584 – A naval expedition led by Pedro Sarmiento de Gamboa founds Nombre de Jesús, the first of two short-lived Spanish settlements in the Strait of Magellan. 
1586 – Sir Francis Drake with an English force captures and occupies the Spanish colonial port of Cartagena de Indias for two months, obtaining a ransom and booty.

1601–1900
1659 – The assault on Copenhagen by Swedish forces is beaten back with heavy losses.
1794 – First session of United States Senate opens to the public.
1808 – Jesse Fell burns anthracite on an open grate as an experiment in heating homes with coal.
1812 – Massachusetts governor Elbridge Gerry is accused of "gerrymandering" for the first time.
1823 – Carnival tragedy of 1823: About 110 boys are killed during a stampede at the Convent of the Minori Osservanti in Valletta, Malta.
1826 – University College London is founded as University of London.
1840 – Gaetano Donizetti's opera La fille du régiment receives its first performance in Paris, France.
1843 – Giuseppe Verdi's opera I Lombardi alla prima crociata receives its first performance in Milan, Italy.
1855 – Kassa Hailu is crowned Tewodros II, Emperor of Ethiopia.
1856 – The Kingdom of Awadh is annexed by the British East India Company and Wajid Ali Shah, the king of Awadh, is deposed.
1858 – Bernadette Soubirous's first vision of the Blessed Virgin Mary occurs in Lourdes, France.
1861 – American Civil War: The United States House of Representatives unanimously passes a resolution guaranteeing noninterference with slavery in any state.
1873 – King Amadeo I of Spain abdicates, forming the First Spanish Republic.
1889 – The Meiji Constitution of Japan is adopted.

1901–present
1903 – Anton Bruckner's 9th Symphony receives its first performance in Vienna, Austria.
1906 – Pope Pius X publishes the encyclical Vehementer Nos.
1919 – Friedrich Ebert (SPD), is elected President of Germany.
1929 – The Kingdom of Italy and the Vatican sign the Lateran Treaty.
1937 – The Flint sit-down strike ends when General Motors recognizes the United Auto Workers trade union.
1938 – BBC Television produces the world's first ever science fiction television programme, an adaptation of a section of the Karel Čapek play R.U.R., that coined the term "robot".
1942 – World War II: Second day of the Battle of Bukit Timah is fought in Singapore.
1953 – Cold War: U.S. President Dwight D. Eisenhower denies all appeals for clemency for Julius and Ethel Rosenberg.
  1953   – Israeli-Soviet relations are severed.
1959 – The Federation of Arab Emirates of the South is created as a protectorate of the United Kingdom.
1970 – Japan launches Ohsumi, becoming the fourth nation to put an object into orbit using its own booster.
1971 – Cold War: the Seabed Arms Control Treaty opened for signature outlawing nuclear weapons on the ocean floor in international waters.
1978 – Pacific Western Airlines Flight 314 crashes at the Cranbrook/Canadian Rockies International Airport in Cranbrook, British Columbia, Canada with 42 deaths and seven survivors.
1979 – The Iranian Revolution establishes an Islamic theocracy under the leadership of Ayatollah Ruhollah Khomeini.
1990 – Nelson Mandela is released from Victor Verster Prison outside Cape Town, South Africa after 27 years as a political prisoner.
  1990   – Buster Douglas, a 42:1 underdog, knocks out Mike Tyson in ten rounds at Tokyo to win boxing's world Heavyweight title.
1997 – Space Shuttle Discovery is launched on a mission to service the Hubble Space Telescope.
1999 – Pluto crosses Neptune's orbit, ending a nearly 20-year period when it was closer to the Sun than the gas giant; Pluto is not expected to interact with Neptune's orbit again until 2231.
2001 – A Dutch programmer launched the Anna Kournikova virus infecting millions of emails via a trick photo of the tennis star.
2008 – Rebel East Timorese soldiers seriously wound President José Ramos-Horta. Rebel leader Alfredo Reinado is killed in the attack.
2011 – Arab Spring: The first wave of the Egyptian revolution culminates in the resignation of Hosni Mubarak and the transfer of power to the Supreme Military Council after 17 days of protests.
2013 – The Vatican confirmed that Pope Benedict XVI would resign the papacy as a result of his advanced age.
  2013   – Militants claiming to be from the Sultanate of Sulu invade Lahad Datu District, Sabah, Malaysia, beginning the Lahad Datu standoff.
2014 – A military transport plane crashes in a mountainous area of Oum El Bouaghi Province in eastern Algeria, killing 77 people.
2015 – A university student was murdered as she resisted an attempted rape in Turkey, sparking nationwide protests and public outcry against harassment and violence against women.
2016 – A man shoots seven people dead at an education center in Jizan Province, Saudi Arabia.
2017 – North Korea test fires a ballistic missile across the Sea of Japan.
2018 – Saratov Airlines Flight 703 crashes near Moscow, Russia with 71 deaths and no survivors.
2020 – COVID-19 pandemic: The World Health Organization officially names the coronavirus outbreak as COVID-19, with the virus being designated SARS-CoV-2.

Births

Pre-1600
1380 – Poggio Bracciolini, Italian scholar and translator (d. 1459)
1466 – Elizabeth of York (d. 1503)
1535 – Pope Gregory XIV (d. 1591)
1568 – Honoré d'Urfé, French author and playwright (d. 1625)

1601–1900
1649 – William Carstares, Scottish minister and academic (d. 1715)
1657 – Bernard Le Bovier de Fontenelle, French poet and playwright (d. 1757)
1708 – Egidio Duni, Italian composer (d. 1775)
1764 – Joseph Chénier, French poet and playwright (d. 1811)
1776 – Ioannis Kapodistrias, Greek politician, 1st Governor of Greece (d. 1831)
1800 – Henry Fox Talbot, English photographer and politician, invented the calotype (d. 1877)
1802 – Lydia Maria Child, American journalist, author, and activist (d. 1880)
1805 – Jean Baptiste Charbonneau, Native American-French Canadian explorer (d. 1866)
1812 – Alexander H. Stephens, American lawyer and politician, Vice President of the Confederate States of America (d. 1883)
1813 – Otto Ludwig, German author, playwright, and critic (d. 1865)
1821 – Auguste Mariette, French archaeologist and scholar (d. 1881)
1830 – Hans Bronsart von Schellendorff, Prussian pianist and composer (d. 1913)
1833 – Melville Fuller, American lawyer and jurist, 8th Chief Justice of the United States (d. 1910)
1839 – Josiah Willard Gibbs, American physicist (d. 1903)
1845 – Ahmet Tevfik Pasha, Ottoman soldier and politician, Grand Vizier of the Ottoman Empire (d. 1936)
1847 – Thomas Edison, American engineer and businessman, developed the light bulb and phonograph (d. 1931)
1855 – Ellen Day Hale, American painter and author (d. 1940)
1860 – Rachilde, French author and playwright (d. 1953)
1863 – John F. Fitzgerald, American politician; Mayor of Boston (d. 1950)
1864 – Louis Bouveault, French chemist (d. 1909)
1869 – Helene Kröller-Müller, German-Dutch art collector and philanthropist, founded the Kröller-Müller Museum (d. 1939)
  1869   – Else Lasker-Schüler, German poet and author (d. 1945)
1874 – Elsa Beskow, Swedish author and illustrator (d. 1953)
1881 – Carlo Carrà, Italian painter (d. 1966)
1888 – John Warren Davis, American educator, college administrator, and civil rights leader (d. 1980)
1897 – Emil Leon Post, Polish-American mathematician and logician (d.1954)
1898 – Leo Szilard, Hungarian-American physicist and academic (d. 1964)
1900 – Ellen Broe, Danish nurse, pioneer in nursing education (d. 1994)
  1900   – Hans-Georg Gadamer, German philosopher and scholar (d. 2002)
  1900   – Jōsei Toda, Japanese educator and activist (d. 1958)

1901–present
1902 – Arne Jacobsen, Danish architect, designed Radisson Blu Royal Hotel (d. 1971)
1904 – Keith Holyoake, New Zealand farmer and politician, 26th Prime Minister of New Zealand (d. 1983)
  1904   – Lucile Randon, French supercentenarian (d. 2023)
1908 – Philip Dunne, American screenwriter (d. 1992)
  1908   – Vivian Fuchs, English explorer (d. 1999)
1909 – Max Baer, American boxer and actor (d. 1959)
  1909   – Joseph L. Mankiewicz, American director, producer, and screenwriter (d. 1993)
1912 – Rudolf Firkušný, Czech-American pianist and educator (d. 1994)
1914 – Matt Dennis, American singer-songwriter and pianist (d. 2002)
  1914   – Josh White, American blues singer-songwriter and guitarist (d. 1969)
1915 – Patrick Leigh Fermor, English soldier, author, and scholar (d. 2011)
  1915   – Richard Hamming, American mathematician and academic (d. 1998)
1917 – Sidney Sheldon, American author and screenwriter (d. 2007)
1920 – Farouk I, King of Egypt (d. 1965)
  1920   – Daniel F. Galouye, American author (d. 1976)
  1920   – Billy Halop, American actor (d. 1976)
  1920   – Daniel James, Jr., American general and pilot (d. 1978)
1921 – Lloyd Bentsen, American politician, 69th United States Secretary of the Treasury (d. 2006)
  1921   – Ottavio Missoni, Italian hurdler and fashion designer, founded Missoni (d. 2013)
1923 – Antony Flew, English philosopher and academic (d. 2010)
1924 – Budge Patty, American tennis player (d. 2021)
1925 – Virginia E. Johnson, American psychologist and academic (d. 2013)
  1925   – Kim Stanley, American actress (d. 2001)
1926 – Paul Bocuse, French chef (d. 2018)
  1926   – Leslie Nielsen, Canadian-American actor and producer (d. 2010)
1930 – Roy De Forest, American painter and academic (d. 2007).
1932 – Dennis Skinner, English miner and politician
1934 – Mel Carnahan, American lawyer and politician, 51st Governor of Missouri (d. 2000)
  1934   – Tina Louise, American actress and singer
  1934   – Manuel Noriega, Panamanian general and politician, Military leader of Panama (d. 2017)
  1934   – Mary Quant, British fashion designer
  1934   – David Taylor, English veterinarian and television host (d. 2013)
1935 – Gene Vincent, American singer and guitarist (d. 1971)
1936 – Burt Reynolds, American actor and director (d. 2018)
1937 – Ian Gow, British politician (d. 1990)
  1937   – Bill Lawry, Australian cricketer and sportscaster
  1937   – Eddie Shack, Canadian ice hockey player (d. 2020)
  1937   – Phillip Walker, American singer and guitarist (d. 2010)
1938 – Bevan Congdon, New Zealand cricketer (d. 2018)
1939 – Gerry Goffin, American songwriter (d. 2014)
1941 – Sérgio Mendes, Brazilian pianist and composer
1942 – Otis Clay, American singer-songwriter (d. 2016)
1943 – Joselito, Spanish singer and actor
  1943   – Alan Rubin, American trumpet player (d. 2011)
1944 – Mike Oxley, American lawyer and politician (d. 2016)
  1944   – Joy Williams, American novelist, short story writer, and essayist
1946 – Ian Porterfield, Scottish footballer and manager (d. 2007)
1947 – Yukio Hatoyama, Japanese engineer and politician and Prime Minister of Japan
  1947   – Derek Shulman, Scottish singer-songwriter and producer
1951 – Mike Leavitt, American politician, 14th Governor of Utah
1953 – Philip Anglim, American actor
  1953   – Jeb Bush, American banker and politician, 43rd Governor of Florida
  1953   – Tom Veryzer, American baseball player (d. 2014)
1954 – Wesley Strick, American director and screenwriter
1956 – Didier Lockwood, French violinist (d. 2018)
1956 – Catherine Hickland, American actress
1957 – Tina Ambani, Indian actress and chairperson
1959 – Roberto Moreno, Brazilian race car driver
1960 – Richard Mastracchio, American engineer and astronaut
1962 – Tammy Baldwin, American lawyer and politician
  1962   – Sheryl Crow, American singer-songwriter and guitarist
1964 – Sarah Palin, American politician, 9th Governor of Alaska
  1964   – Ken Shamrock, American martial artist and wrestler
1965 – Vicki Wilson, Australian netball player
1968 – Mo Willems, American author and illustrator
1969 – Jennifer Aniston, American actress and producer
  1969   – Andreas Hilfiker, Swiss footballer
  1969   – John Salako, Nigerian-English footballer, manager, and sportscaster
1971 – Damian Lewis, English actor
1972 – Steve McManaman, English footballer
1973 – Varg Vikernes, Norwegian guitarist and songwriter
1974 – Nick Barmby, English international footballer and manager
  1974   – D'Angelo, American singer-songwriter, guitarist, and producer
  1974   – Alex Jones, American radio show host and conspiracy theorist
  1974   – Jaroslav Špaček, Czech ice hockey player and coach
1975 – Andy Lally, American race car driver
  1975   – Callum Thorp, Australian cricketer
  1975   – Jacque Vaughn, American basketball player and coach
1976 – Tony Battie, American basketball player and sportscaster
1977 – Mike Shinoda, American musician and artist
1979 – Brandy Norwood, American singer-songwriter, producer, and actress
1981 – Kelly Rowland, American singer and actress
1982 – Natalie Dormer, English actress
  1982   – Ľubomíra Kalinová, Slovak biathlete
  1982   – Neil Robertson, Australian snooker player
1983 – Rafael van der Vaart, Dutch international footballer
1984 – Maarten Heisen, Dutch sprinter
  1984   – Marco Marcato, Italian cyclist
  1984   – Maxime Talbot, Canadian ice hockey player
1985 – Šárka Strachová, Czech skier
1986 – Gabriel Boric, Chilean politician, 36th President of Chile
1987 – Luca Antonelli, Italian footballer
  1987   – Juanmi Callejón, Spanish footballer
  1987   – Ellen van Dijk, Dutch cyclist
  1987   – Brian Matusz, American baseball player
  1987   – Jan Smeekens, Dutch speed skater
1988 – Vlad Moldoveanu, Romanian basketball player
1990 – Javier Aquino, Mexican footballer
1991 – Nikola Mirotic, Spanish basketball player
1992 – Lasse Norman Hansen, Danish track and road cyclist
  1992   – Taylor Lautner, American actor
1993 – Ben McLemore, American basketball player
1994 – Dansby Swanson, American baseball player
1995 – Milan Škriniar, Slovak footballer
1996 – Daniil Medvedev, Russian tennis player
  1996   – Jonathan Tah, German footballer
1997 – Hubert Hurkacz, Polish tennis player
1998 – Khalid, American singer and songwriter

Deaths

Pre-1600
AD 55 – Britannicus, Roman son of Claudius (b. 41)
 244 – Gordian III, Roman emperor (b. 225)
 641 – Heraclius, Byzantine emperor (b. 575)
 731 – Pope Gregory II (b. 669)
 824 – Pope Paschal I
1141 – Hugh of Saint Victor, German philosopher and theologian (b. 1096)
1503 – Elizabeth of York (b. 1466)

1601–1900
1626 – Pietro Cataldi, Italian mathematician and astronomer (b. 1548)
1650 – René Descartes, French mathematician and philosopher (b. 1596)
1755 – Francesco Scipione, marchese di Maffei, Italian archaeologist, playwright, and critic (b. 1675)
1763 – William Shenstone, English poet and gardener (b. 1714)
1795 – Carl Michael Bellman, Swedish poet and composer (b. 1740)
1829 – Alexander Griboyedov, Russian poet, playwright, and composer (b. 1795)
1862 – Elizabeth Siddal, English poet and artist's model (b. 1829)
1868 – Léon Foucault, French physicist and academic (b. 1819)
1898 – Félix María Zuloaga, Mexican general and unconstitutional interim president (b. 1813)

1901–present
1901 – Milan I of Serbia (b. 1855)
1917 – Oswaldo Cruz, Brazilian physician and epidemiologist (b. 1872)
1918 – Alexey Kaledin, Russian general (b. 1861)
1931 – Charles Algernon Parsons, English-Irish engineer, invented the steam turbine (b. 1854)
1940 – John Buchan, Scottish-Canadian historian and politician, Governor General of Canada (b. 1875)
  1940   – Ellen Day Hale, American painter and author (b. 1855)
1942 – Jamnalal Bajaj, Indian businessman and philanthropist (b. 1884)
1947 – Martin Klein, Estonian wrestler and coach (b. 1884)
1948 – Sergei Eisenstein, Russian director and screenwriter (b. 1898)
1949 – Axel Munthe, Swedish doctor (b. 1857)
1958 – Ernest Jones, Welsh neurologist and psychoanalyst (b. 1879)
1963 – John Olof Dahlgren, Swedish-American soldier, Medal of Honor recipient (b. 1872)
  1963   – Sylvia Plath, American poet, novelist, and short story writer (b. 1932)
1967 – A. J. Muste, Dutch-American minister and activist (b. 1885)
1968 – Howard Lindsay, American playwright (b. 1889)
1973 – J. Hans D. Jensen, German physicist and academic, Nobel Prize laureate (b. 1907)
1975 – Richard Ratsimandrava, Malagasy colonel and politician, President of Madagascar (b. 1931)
1976 – Lee J. Cobb, American actor (b. 1911)
  1976   – Alexander Lippisch, German pilot and engineer (b. 1894)
1977 – Fakhruddin Ali Ahmed, Indian lawyer and politician, 5th President of India (b. 1905)
  1977   – Louis Beel, Dutch academic and politician, Prime Minister of the Netherlands (b. 1902)
1978 – James Bryant Conant, American chemist and academic (b. 1893)
  1978   – Harry Martinson, Swedish novelist, essayist, and poet, Nobel Prize laureate (b. 1904)
1982 – Eleanor Powell, American actress and dancer (b. 1912)
1985 – Henry Hathaway, American actor, director, and producer (b. 1898)
1986 – Frank Herbert, American journalist and author (b. 1920)
1989 – George O'Hanlon, American actor and voice artist (b. 1912)
1993 – Robert W. Holley, American biochemist and academic, Nobel Prize laureate (b. 1922)
1994 – Neil Bonnett, American race car driver (b. 1946)
  1994   – Sorrell Booke, American actor and director (b. 1930)
  1994   – William Conrad, American actor, director, and producer (b. 1920)
  1994   – Paul Feyerabend, Austrian-Swiss philosopher and academic (b. 1924)
1996 – Amelia Rosselli, Italian poet and author (b. 1930)
2000 – Lord Kitchner, Trinidadian singer (b. 1922)
  2000   – Roger Vadim, French director, producer, and screenwriter (b. 1928)
2002 – Frankie Crosetti, American baseball player and coach (b. 1910)
  2002   – Barry Foster, English actor (b. 1931)
2004 – Shirley Strickland, Australian runner (b. 1925)
2005 – Jack L. Chalker, American author (b. 1944)
2006 – Peter Benchley, American author and screenwriter (b. 1940)
  2006   – Ken Fletcher, Australian tennis player (b. 1940)
  2006   – Jackie Pallo, English wrestler and actor (b. 1926)
2008 – Tom Lantos, American lawyer and politician (b. 1928)
  2008   – Frank Piasecki, American engineer (b. 1919)
2009 – Estelle Bennett, American singer (b. 1941)
  2009   – Willem Johan Kolff, Dutch-American physician and academic (b. 1911)
2010 – Heward Grafftey, Canadian businessman and politician (b. 1928)
  2010   – Alexander McQueen, English fashion designer, founder of his eponymous brand (b. 1969)
2011 – Chuck Tanner, American baseball player and manager (b. 1928)
2012 – Siri Bjerke, Norwegian politician, Norwegian Minister of the Environment (b. 1958)
  2012   – Aharon Davidi, Israeli general (b. 1927)
  2012   – Whitney Houston, American singer-songwriter, producer, and actress (b. 1963)
2013 – Rick Huxley, English bass player (b. 1940)
2014 – Alice Babs, Swedish singer and actress (b. 1924)
  2014   – Tito Canepa, Dominican-American painter (b. 1916)
  2014   – Fernando González Pacheco, Colombian journalist and actor (b. 1932)
2015 – Roger Hanin, French actor, director, and screenwriter (b. 1925)
  2015   – Bob Simon, American journalist (b. 1941)
  2015   – Jerry Tarkanian, American basketball player and coach (b. 1930)
2016 – Kevin Randleman, American mixed martial artist and wrestler (b. 1971)
  2016   – Zeng Xuelin, Thai-Chinese footballer and manager (b. 1929)
2017 – Fab Melo, Brazilian basketball player (b. 1990)
  2017   – Jaap Rijks, Dutch Olympian (b. 1919)
2018 – Vic Damone, American singer, songwriter and actor (b. 1928)
  2018   – Asma Jahangir, Pakistani human-rights lawyer and social activist (b. 1952)
  2018   – Jan Maxwell, American stage and television actress (b. 1956)
  2018   – Qazi Wajid, Pakistani drama actor, writer and artist (b. 1930)

Holidays and observances
 Christian feast day:
 Blaise Eastern Orthodox liturgics
 Cædmon, first recorded Christian poet in England,  (Anglicanism)
 Gobnait
 Gregory II
 Lazarus of Milan
 European 112 Day (European Union)
 Armed Forces Day (Liberia)
 Evelio Javier Day (Panay Island, the Philippines)
 Feast day of Our Lady of Lourdes (Catholic Church), and its related observance
 World Day of the Sick (Roman Catholic Church)
 Inventors' Day (United States)
 National Foundation Day (Japan)
 Youth Day (Cameroon)
 International Day of Women and Girls in Science (UN Women)

Notes

References

External links

 BBC: On This Day
 
 Historical Events on February 11

Days of the year
February